Felipe Bezerra Brisola (born 6 June 1990) is a Brazilian footballer who plays as a midfielder for A Lyga club FK Riteriai.

Career

In Brazil
Felipe Brisola started his professional career at Anapolina. In the first four months of 2011 he played 18 matches and scored two goals in 2011 Campeonato Goiano.

On 4 May 2011, Brisola signed a contract with Série A club Atlético Goianiense. He made his league debut as a substitute for Vitor Júnior in the 66th minute of a 1–0 win over Coritiba on 22 May. In 2013 Brisola joined Vila Nova on loan to gain first team experience.

In 2014 Brisola re-signed with Anapolina. In 2015 he moved to CRAC, playing only two games in the 2015 Campeonato Brasileiro Série D.

In December 2015, Brisola joined Itumbiara and made 14 appearances for the team during the 2016 Campeonato Goiano.

Botev Plovdiv

2016-17

On 16 June 2016, Brisola joined Bulgarian First League club Botev Plovdiv. He made his debut on 30 July during the 1–1 draw against Lokomotiv Plovdiv. On 21 September, Brisola scored twice in a 6–3 away win over Pirin Gotse Delchev for the Bulgarian Cup. Three days later, he scored his first league goal for Botev in a 2–1 win over Dunav Ruse and won the award for man of the match.

2017-18

On 6 July 2017 Brisola scored the only goal during the 1-0 win over Partizani Tirana in the 1st qualifying round of UEFA Europa League. On 20 July Brisola came on as a substitute and scored a goal in the final minutes during the 4-0 win over Beitar Jerusalem in the 2nd qualifying round of UEFA Europa League.

On 12 December Brisola scored a goal for the 5-0 win over Litex Lovech in the quarter final of the Bulgarian Cup.

He left the club at the end of the season when his contract was terminated by mutual consent.

Career statistics

Club

Honours
Botev Plovdiv
 Bulgarian Cup: 2016–17
 Bulgarian Supercup: 2017

References

External links 

1990 births
Living people
Brazilian footballers
Brazilian expatriate footballers
Campeonato Brasileiro Série A players
First Professional Football League (Bulgaria) players
Associação Atlética Anapolina players
Vila Nova Futebol Clube players
Atlético Clube Goianiense players
Clube Recreativo e Atlético Catalano players
Itumbiara Esporte Clube players
Botev Plovdiv players
Riga FC players
Brazilian expatriate sportspeople in Bulgaria
Expatriate footballers in Bulgaria
Expatriate footballers in Latvia
Association football wingers
Sportspeople from Roraima